Bodenmais is a municipality in the district of Regen in Bavaria in Germany. It lies at one end of the Zeller Valley in the Bavarian Forest.

There is also a mining museum, reminding of ages of ferro-oxide mining and vitriol production. Some shafts are still accessible. 

The village itself is known for its glass shops, the most notable being Joska Glasparadies (Joska glass paradise).

References

Regen (district)
Bavarian Forest